Peltodoris punctifera is a species of sea slug, a dorid nudibranch, shell-less marine gastropod mollusks in the family Discodorididae.

Distribution
This marine species occurs in European waters.

References

 Abraham P. (1877), Revision of the anthobranchiate nudibranchiate Mollusca with descriptions or notices of forty-one hitherto undescribed species. Proceedings of the Zoological Society of London. 1877: 196-269, pl. 28-30
  Ortea J. & Bacallado J.J. (1981). Les Dorididae (Gastropoda) décrits des Canaries par Alcide d'Orbigny. Bulletin du Muséum d'Histoire Naturelle, Paris. (4)3, section A, 3: 575-584
  Dayrat B. 2010. A monographic revision of discodorid sea slugs (Gastropoda, Opisthobranchia, Nudibranchia, Doridina). Proceedings of the California Academy of Sciences, Series 4, vol. 61, suppl. I, 1-403, 382 figs.

Discodorididae
Gastropods described in 1877